KOMG (105.1 FM, "The Bull") is a radio station licensed to Willard, Missouri, United States. KOMG airs a classic country music format branded as "105.1 The Bull".

Current On-Air Staff:

 Mornings with Summer Stevens: 5:30 am–10:00 am
 Summer Stevens: 10:00 am to noon
 Crews: Noon-3:00pm
 Corbin Campbell: 3:00 pm– 6:00pm

External links

OMG